SpaceX Crew-7 is planned to be the seventh crewed operational NASA Commercial Crew flight of a Crew Dragon spacecraft, and the thirteenth overall crewed orbital flight. The mission is planned for launch in the second half of August 2023. The Crew-7 mission would transport four crew members to the International Space Station (ISS). , one NASA astronaut, Jasmin Moghbeli, one ESA astronaut,  Andreas Mogensen of Denmark, and one Roscosmos cosmonaut, Konstantin Borisov, have been assigned to the mission, with Mogensen as the first non-American to serve as a pilot of Crew Dragon. Satoshi Furukawa was named to this mission in 2022.

Crew

Mission 
The seventh SpaceX operational mission in the Commercial Crew Program is scheduled to launch in August 2023.

The European segment of the mission is called Huginn.

References 

SpaceX Dragon 2
2023 in spaceflight
SpaceX payloads contracted by NASA
SpaceX human spaceflights
Future human spaceflights
2023 in the United States